Luis Aníbal Rodríguez Pardo (born 12 January 1915 in Punata, died 26 March 2004) was the Roman Catholic  Archbishop of Santa Cruz de la Sierra (Bolivia).

References

Bolivian Roman Catholic archbishops
1915 births
2004 deaths
20th-century Roman Catholic bishops in Bolivia
Roman Catholic bishops of Cochabamba
Roman Catholic bishops of Oruro
Roman Catholic archbishops of Santa Cruz de la Sierra
Roman Catholic military bishops of Bolivia